Voinstvuiuschii ateizm (lit.  «Militant Atheism») was an antireligious monthly magazine in Russian, German and Esperanto, which was published in the course of 1931, January to December, in the USSR.

League of Militant Atheists began publishing a magazine «Voinstvuiuschii ateizm» in 1931. The magazine was the organ of the Central Council of the League of Militant Atheists of the USSR. P. A. Krasikov became the editor-in-chief of the magazine. This magazine was a replacement for the magazine «Ateist». The editorial board of the journal included Y. M. Yaroslavsky, F. M. Putintsev, A. A. Ivanovskii, E. D. Krinitsky, A. T. Lukachevsky, N. M. Matorin, A. Nyrchuk, V. N. Ralcevic, I. A. Shpitsberg (responsible secretary). The magazine published articles on various issues of Marxist atheism, criticism of bourgeois theories of the origin of religion, the history of atheism and free-thinking, as well as the experience of atheistic education.

The circulation of the magazine was 5500 copies. The publishing house of the magazine was in Moscow, on Sretenka Street, 10.

Dimitry Pospielovsky believes that the "scholarship" of the magazine did not fare very well, for the 1932 year it was swallowed up by magazine «Antireligioznik».

See also 

 Bezbozhnik (newspaper)
 Council for Religious Affairs
 Persecutions of the Catholic Church and Pius XII
 Persecution of Christians in the Soviet Union
 Persecution of Muslims in the former USSR
 Religion in the Soviet Union
 State atheism
 USSR anti-religious campaign (1928–1941)

Notes

References
 Orthodox Encyclopedia Воинствующий атеизм. Т. 9, С. 210-211
 Воинствующее безбожие в СССР за 15 лет. 1917-1932 : сборник / Центральный совет Союза воинствующих безбожников и Институт философии Коммунистической академии ; под редакцией М. Енишерлова, А. Лукачевского, М. Митина. - Москва : ОГИЗ : Государственное антирелигиозное издательство, 1932. - 525, (2) с. : ил., портр.;/ С. 395
 Воронцов, Георгий Васильевич. «Ленинская программа атеистического воспитания в действии (1917-1937 гг.)» / Ленингр. гос. ун-т им. А. А. Жданова. Ин-т повышения квалификации преподавателей обществ. наук. - [Ленинград] : Изд-во Ленингр. ун-та, 1973. - 174 с.;
 Православие: Словарь атеиста / Под ред. Н. С. Гордиенко. — М.: Политиздат, 1988. — 270[2] с.; 17 см.;  : /  Стр. 58
 Периодическая печать СССР 1917-1949. Том 1. Библиографический указатель. Издательство: М:, Всесоюзной книжной палаты . Год: 1958. / Стр. 85-86
 Атеистический словарь / [Абдусамедов А. И., Алейник Р. М., Алиева Б. А. и др. ; под общ. ред. М. П. Новикова]. - 2-е изд., испр. и доп. - Москва : Политиздат, 1985. - 512 с.; 20 см / С. 92

Magazines established in 1931
1931 disestablishments in the Soviet Union
Magazines published in Moscow
1931 establishments in the Soviet Union
Magazines disestablished in 1931
Monthly magazines published in Russia
Atheism publications
Magazines published in the Soviet Union
Russian-language magazines
German-language magazines
Propaganda in the Soviet Union
Anti-religious campaign in the Soviet Union
Anti-Christian sentiment in Europe
Anti-Christian sentiment in Asia
Propaganda newspapers and magazines
Persecution of Muslims
Religious persecution by communists
Militanta ateismo
Anti-Islam sentiment in the Soviet Union